St. Paul Church, alternatively known as the Bebekli Kilise, is a Roman Catholic Church in Adana. The church was built as an Armenian Apostolic Church in 1870, and handed over to the Apostolic Vicariate of Anatolia in 1915, after the Ottoman deportation of the city's large Armenian community over the course of Armenian genocide. St. Paul Church is located close to the 5 Ocak Square, off the Cemal Gürsel Street. The 2.5 meter high bronze statue of Mary resembled a baby to the people walking by and the church became known as the "Church with Baby" (Bebekli Kilise).

The church currently serves to the Catholic and the Orthodox Community of Adana. The garden of the church is converted into a car parking to raise income for the church.

References

See also
 Christianity in Turkey

Roman Catholic churches in Adana
Landmarks in Adana
Buildings and structures in Adana
Pauline churches
19th-century churches in Turkey
Former Armenian Apostolic churches